The Face Men Thailand Season 3  is a reality show to find the best models and actors

On 23 September 2019, there was an official press release. The new mentors of this season have been released Akamsiri Suwanasuk, Jirayu La-ongmanee, Araya Indra and Ajirapa Meisinger. Antoine Pinto is still the host of the program. With the program scheduled to air for the first time on October 5 of the same year.

Contestants
(ages stated are at start of filming)

Episodes

Episode 1: Casting, Acting Skill, Team Selection, Photo Shoot and Promotional Video

First aired 5 October 2019

The host Antoine Pinto welcomed 7 new contestants, after which there were 7 more contestants from the past season, 5 from The Face Men Thailand Season 2. And male contestants from The Face Thailand Season 5 2 people as follows

The Face Men Thailand season 2: Best, Bom, Paul, Kim, Film
The Face Thailand season 5: Marcos, Greg

Afterwards, the 4 mentors of this season were released, including Cicada Akamsiri, Kao Jirayu, Art Araya and Sabina Akirapa. After the introduction of Mentor The All contestants have walked the model and showed off their acting skills. In the meantime, Mentor will give points to each contestant. The next round, dressed according to their own personality, so Mentor chooses to join the team. Divided into three teams Three to five people in each team, as chosen by the mentor or the contestants.

When selecting contestants, the team still uses the same rules as previous seasons. For this round, Kim is the person who scores the most points during the audition. Therefore, can choose a team without the mentor to have the right to choose, while holding only one who has no mentor to join the team

Team Kao : Boss, Film, Marcos, Best, Thony
Team Jakjaan : Greg, Peak, Bom, Paul, CGame
Team Art/Sabina : Kim, Timmy, Jybb

After the selection of the work team is finished The first campaign was started immediately, namely shooting posters and promoting videos. In which everyone, including mentors, have to run a joint campaign Art / Sabina team with Kim, the team with the most votes from the audition, selected the ninth place to start as the first team. Followed by the cicada team And the Art / Sabina team

 The winning team of the campaign: Team Art Sabina
 Bottom two: None

Episode 2: A Walk of Remembrance 

First aired 12 October 2019

 The winning team of the campaign: Team Art Sabina
 Bottom four: Marcos Alexandre, Best Phanthakoengamon, CGame Wichaikum and Greg de Bodt
 Eliminated: Best Phanthakoengamon

Episode 3: The Love of My Life 

First aired 19 October 2019

 The winning team of the campaign: Team Kao
 Bottom two: Peak Rattanapet and Jybb Maha-Udomporn
 Eliminated: None

Episode 4: The Ride of Dignity 

First aired 26 October 2019

 The winning team of the campaign: Team Jakjaan
 Bottom four: Jybb Maha-Udomporn, Timmy Sanner, Kim Goodburn and Film Uengwanit
 Eliminated: Kim Goodburn

Episode 5: Love is For All 

First aired 2 November 2019

 The winning team of the campaign: Team Art Sabina
 Bottom two: Film Uengwanit and Greg de Bodt
 Eliminated: Film Uengwanit

Episode 6: Stay Cold

First aired 9 November 2019

 The winning team of the campaign: Team Kao
 Bottom two: Bom Thanawatyanyong and Jybb Maha-Udomporn
 Eliminated: Jybb Maha-Udomporn

Episode 7: The Magic Move

First aired 16 November 2019

 The winning team of the campaign: Team Art Sabina
 Bottom two: Thony Blane and CGame Wichaikum
 Eliminated: None

Episode 8: New Face Mission

First aired 23 November 2019

 The winning team of the campaign: Team Art Sabina
 Bottom four: Boss Darayon, Thony Blane, Marcos Alexandre and Paul de Bodt
 Eliminated: Marcos Alexandre

Episode 9 :  The Adventurous Voyage 
First aired 30 November 2019

 Winning coach and team:Team Kao Final three was chosen by Coach: Boss, Timmy, CGame Fourth was chosen by coach from winning campaign team: Thony Eliminated:Peak, Bom, Greg, Paul.
 Special guest: Philip Thinroj, Chamnuyn Phakdeesuk, Adam Zima

 Episode 10: Final walk 
First aired 8 December 2019
 Winning coach and team: Team Kao
 Winning campaign : Boss
  The Face Men Thailand: Boss
  Runner-up: CGame, Timmy, Thony

Summaries

Elimination table

 The contestant was part of the winning team for the episode.
 The contestant was at risk of elimination.
 The contestant was eliminated from the competition.
 The contestant was immune from elimination.
 The contestant was immune from elimination but was at risk of elimination.
 The contestant was originally eliminated but invited back as a guest in a campaign.
 The contestant was a Runner-Up.
 The contestant won The Face Men.

 Episode 1 was the casting episode. The final thirteen were divided into individual teams of three to five as they were selected.
 In episodes 2–9, contestant who was eliminated to the competition. They will be able to attend Master Class, but can't do Campaign.
 In episode 2 team had lose campaign in episode 1 must choose one contestant for the elimination together with team had lose campaign in this episode. team Kao and team Jakjaan had lose campaign in 2 times. Kao nominated Best and Marcos while Jakjaan nominated CGame and Greg. Art and Sabina eliminated Best.
 In episodes 3–8, after announced campaign in episode. The show will choose one contestant for give immune from elimination.
 In episode 3, team Kao won the campaign. Jakjaan nominated Peak while Art and Sabina nominated Jybb for the elimination. Kao didn't eliminate both of them.
 In episode 4, team Jakjaan won the campaign. Kao nominated Film while Art and Sabina nominated all contestants for the elimination. Jakjaan eliminated Kim.
 In episode 7, team Art and Sabina won the campaign. Kao nominated Thony while Jakjaan nominated CGame for the elimination. Art and Sabina didn't eliminate both of them.
 In episode 8, team Art and Sabina won the campaign. Kao nominated all contestants for the elimination while Jakjaan nominated Paul for the elimination. Art and Sabina eliminated Marcos.
 In episode 9, Art Sabina Kao and Jakjaan were allowed to choose any one contestant to advance into the finale from the remaining eighth models. Timmy automatically advancing into the finale. Kao chose Boss. Jakjaan chose CGame. Team Kao won the campaign individually and chose Thony advancing into the finale. Paul Peak Bom and Greg were eliminated.

Campaigns

 Episode 1: Runway, Acting Skill and Self Administered 'Transformations' (Casting) / Photo Shoot and Promotional Video
 Episode 2: Thai silk costumes Fashion Show
 Episode 3: Lovely Mother and Son Photoshoot
 Episode 4: Fashion Video with Horse
 Episode 5: Man love Man acting
 Episode 6: Cool Stage Photoshoot
 Episode 7: Dancing Fashion Video
 Episode 8: Action short film
 Episode 9: Airplane Runway Fashion Show
 Episode 10: Acting and Finalwalk

References

Thailand
2019 Thai television seasons
The Face Thailand seasons